The Jinbei Konect or Jinbei Guanjing (观境) is a mid-size three-row crossover produced by Renault Brilliance Jinbei joint venture under the Jinbei brand.

Overview

The Jinbei Konect or Guanjing was unveiled on the 2018 Beijing Auto Show in China. 
 
Engine options of the Jinbei Konect includes a 1.5 liter turbo inline 4 engine producing 150hp, and a 1.6 liter inline 4 engine producing 118hp.

Prices of the Jinbei Guanjing in China ranges from 75,900 to 102,900 yuan as of 2020.

References

External links
Jinbei Official website

Crossover sport utility vehicles
Mid-size sport utility vehicles
Front-wheel-drive vehicles
Konect
2010s cars
Cars introduced in 2018